Ghuinke (Punjabi and ) is a village in Daska Tehsil of Sialkot District, in the Punjab province of Pakistan.

References

Villages in Sialkot District